The Irish Whales or "The Whales" was a nickname given to a group of Irish, Irish-American and Irish-Canadian athletes who dominated weight-throwing events in the first two decades of the 20th century. "This group dominated the field events, particularly throwing events, at the Amateur Athletic Union national championships and at the Olympic Games between 1896 and 1924." They were primarily members of the Irish American Athletic Club, and the New York Athletic Club and also members of the New York City Police Department. They were known as such because of their athletic prowess, physical size, voracious appetites, and their impact on a generation of sports fans.

The Irish Whales included; John Flanagan, Simon Gillis, James Mitchell, Pat McDonald, Paddy Ryan, Martin Sheridan, Matt McGrath and Con Walsh. What Sheridan lacked in girth, he made up for with his appetite and athletic accomplishments, nine Olympic medals in all. "Matt McGrath was built like a wedge. He was a six-footer, but he weighed 248 pounds. John Flanagan was about the same. Simon Gillis was 6′2″ and 240. Paddy Ryan was 6′5″ and 296, while Pat McDonald was 6′5″ and 300 pounds."

Origin

While it is not entirely clear when this moniker came into use, and was likely not used in the face of any of these giant men, it seems to have first appeared in print in 1937 in John Kieran's New York Times column, "Sports of the Times," written by John Drebinger (who was substituting for Kieran). The term was further popularized in "Sports of the Times" columns written by Arthur Daly in the New York Times, with the first reference to "The Whales" in 1942. On the subject of the origin of this nickname, Daly wrote:

"It was on the Olympic trip of 1912 that the 'whale' nickname took hold. Dan Ferris, then a cherubic little boy, recalls it with relish. 'Those big fellows,' he related, 'all sat at the same table and their waiter was a small chap. Before we reached Stockholm he had lost twenty pounds, worn down by bringing them food. Once as he passed me he muttered under his breath, 'It's whales they are, not men.' They used to take five plates of soup as a starter and then gulp down three or four steaks with trimmings. That Simon Gillis would think nothing of having a dozen eggs for breakfast. But what fascinated me was the way he ate them. He'd put a dab of mustard on each and eat it whole, shell and all.' The Irish American A.C. behemoths always were the life of any party."

Another tale of the Irish Whales' voracious appetites came from Arthur Daly's typewriter twenty-two years later. In a Times column in 1964 he wrote: "Some of their more prodigious feats were at the table. The Irish American A.C. was competing in Baltimore when (Simon) Gillis placed an order for a post-meet snack with the head waiter at a local restaurant. He ordered 27 dozen oysters and six huge T-bone steaks. Slight Miscalculation - The waiter was ready when Gillis, McDonald and McGrath arrived. The table had been set for a party of 33. 'Do you want to wait for the rest of your group?' asked the headwaiter. He turned pale as he watched three whales devour 27 dozen oysters and six huge T-bone steaks."

Summary table
Heights and weights are taken from various reference sources; heights given sometimes vary by several inches, while, obviously, weight can fluctuate substantially over an athlete's career. All Olympic medals won were for the United States, except for Con Walsh's which was for Canada.

See also
Irish American Athletic Club

References
Footnotes

Sources

External links
 Sports.reference.com 1908 Summer Olympics
Winged Fist Organization

New York Athletic Club
Irish-American history
Irish-Canadian culture
Nicknamed groups of Olympic competitors